The Bismarck whistler (Pachycephala citreogaster) is a species of bird in the family Pachycephalidae, which is endemic to the Bismarck Archipelago north-east of New Guinea.

Taxonomy and systematics
Prior to 2015, the western whistler was considered as a subspecies of the Australian golden whistler until recognized as a separate species. Some other authorities still consider it to be a subspecies of a wide-ranging golden whistler, but strong published evidence in favour of either treatment is limited, and further study is warranted to resolve the complex taxonomic situation.

Subspecies
Five subspecies are recognized:
 P. c. citreogaster - Ramsay, 1876: Found on New Hanover, New Britain and New Ireland (Bismarck Archipelago) 
 P. c. sexuvaria - Rothschild & Hartert, 1924: Found on St. Matthias Islands (northern Bismarck Archipelago)
 P. c. goodsoni - Rothschild & Hartert, 1914: Found on Admiralty Islands (north of New Guinea)
 P. c. tabarensis - Mayr, 1955: Found on Tabar Island (eastern Bismarck Archipelago)
 P. c. ottomeyeri - Stresemann, 1933: Found on Lihir Island (eastern Bismarck Archipelago)

Description
The males of the Bismarck whistler are white-throated unlike the yellow-throated males of the oriole whistler (P. orioloides) to the south-east.

References

Bismarck whistler
Birds of the Bismarck Archipelago
Bismarck whistler